Alsószuha is a village in Borsod-Abaúj-Zemplén county, Hungary. It is around 5 km from the Slovak border, and around 50 km north-west of Miskolc.

References

External links 
 Street map 

Populated places in Borsod-Abaúj-Zemplén County